In enzymology, an alanine-glyoxylate transaminase is an enzyme that catalyzes the chemical reaction

L-alanine + glyoxylate  pyruvate + glycine

Thus, the two substrates of this enzyme are L-alanine and glyoxylate, whereas its two products are pyruvate and glycine.

This enzyme belongs to the family of transferases, specifically the transaminases, which transfer nitrogenous groups.  The systematic name of this enzyme class is L-alanine:glyoxylate aminotransferase. Other names in common use include AGT, alanine-glyoxylate aminotransferase, alanine-glyoxylic aminotransferase, and L-alanine-glycine transaminase.  This enzyme participates in alanine and aspartate metabolism and glycine, serine and threonine metabolism.  It employs one cofactor, pyridoxal phosphate.

Structural studies

References

 
 
 

EC 2.6.1
Pyridoxal phosphate enzymes
Enzymes of known structure